The 2022 Split Open was a professional tennis tournament played on clay courts. It was part of the 2022 ATP Challenger Tour. It took place in Split, Croatia between 18 and 24 April 2022.

Singles main-draw entrants

Seeds

 Rankings are as of 11 April 2022.

Other entrants
The following players received wildcards into the singles main draw:
  Luka Mikrut
  Mili Poljičak
  Dino Prižmić

The following players received entry into the singles main draw as special exempts:
  Marco Trungelliti
  Miljan Zekić

The following players received entry from the qualifying draw:
  Matteo Arnaldi
  Michael Geerts
  Luca Nardi
  Johan Nikles
  Alexander Shevchenko
  Máté Valkusz

Champions

Singles

  Christopher O'Connell def.  Zsombor Piros 6–3, 2–0 ret.

Doubles

  Nathaniel Lammons /  Albano Olivetti def.  Sadio Doumbia /  Fabien Reboul 4–6, 7–6(8–6), [10–7].

References

2022 ATP Challenger Tour
April 2022 sports events in Croatia
Split Open
2022 in Croatian sport